Ramachaari is Indian Kannada language television drama series airing on Colors Kannada and premiered on 31 January 2022. It stars Rithvik Krupakar, Mouna Guddemane,  Mithun Tejasvi, Shankar Ashwath, Sirija and Anjali Sudhakar.

Plot 

Ramachari is a person hailing from a middle-class Brahmin family background. In the beginning episodes, it is shown that he goes for the 60th year Pooja, of a wealthy businessman, the father of an arrogant lady named Chaarulatha (aka Chaaru), who had met Ramachari in a chance encounter when she drove her car so fast, while coming back home. But Ramachari stepped over the car, enraging her and this triggered a sense of anger in her. Then, several incidents infuriate her more, eventually, they end up joining the same company (Arjuna Architects). Several days later, Charulatha's father compels his daughter to stay in Ramachari's home, against her wishes. This enrages her more and decides to avenge her insult, thus ruins Ramachari's sister's marriage, causing even more problems to his family. Later when Ramachari is revealed about the truth, he goes to warn her. On the other hand, Charulatha's 3-month task of work experience almost comes to an end, thus demanding a "Performance certificate", from her father, but from Ramachari, not from the Company Manager where she works.  Charulata tries every trick in the book, to forcefully get a certificate from Ramachari, to become the CEO, of her dad's company, but fails every time.

A few days later, Ramachari's sister-in-law is revealed to be suffering from Cancer, which needs at least INR 40 lakhs for her operation, which worries everyone. Narayana Shastri then checks her horoscope, and tells everyone that she will not die soon, but after everyone goes away for dinner, he tells himself that, she will die as predicted by doctors very soon due to Cancer. Then, Ramchari tries to get loan from a known person, but Chaaru plots a drug case against him, and makes him end up in Prison, while it is also shown that Chaaru's mother had bribed the police to arrest Ramachari. When Ramachari gets to know about this through the help of other police working in the same station. Then, he fakes a kidnap of the cop's daughter, which forces him to arrest Maanyata. Then, later Ramachari comes to the station and releases her. When Ramachari kept thinking of ways to get 40 lakhs, for the operation of his sister-in-law, he learns of a new project under the name "Kalpanaa Villas", which happens to be a high-profit project. He manages to get the project, while Chaaru intervenes and takes up the project too. Then, Ramachari gets a plan, and goes to Chitra Durga.  While, Chaaru steals his idea, and follows him till there. When Chaaru is about to kill Ramachari by throwing a huge stone at him, she slips and falls from the cliff. Fearing to this, Ramachari goes and helps her, eventually both of them, get saved but, find themselves in a forest. Then, after they both come out, from there. Ramachari gets wounded by local thugs, while Chaaru is abducted by them. Then, he goes and saves her. The next day, they both think about the project in their own ways, but ramachari would have almost finished the project. Enraged, by this Chaaru sets out to do a cunning heist, and becomes nearly successful in getting the project, and submitting the following day. But Ramachari does not get to know about this, due to his absence after his project went missing. Meanwhile, Manyata hatches a plan to murder Jayshankar's first wife, but her plan backfires, resulting in Chaaru getting trapped in a forest, then several events lead Manyata to beg Naarayanchaari to help him, and Ramachari sets out in the forest, as he knew about the forest since his childhood. After a long time, he finds Chaaru unconscious in the corner of an abandoned house deep inside the forest, then he takes her to the hospital, where the doctors declare her as dead. He gets deeply distressed and feels guilty for her death. Just as she was being taken to the cemetery, tears in her eyes, spotted by Ramachari, causes him to check back her, and when the doctors re-examine her, she is found to be out of danger. This eventually, causes Chaaru to get a sense of bonding with Ramachari. She begins to have feelings for her. She then plans a proposal, for the same, and tells Ramachari (who had gone to collect money for his sister-in-law's operation), to come to a specific location. As Ramachari reaches, he is startled seeing all the decoration, and he questions her, about this. Just as she unveils the banner, containing the words "I Love you", Ramachari, he gets a call, from his home, that his sister-in-law in no more. And he rushes to the hospital, where Aparna is declared dead. 

The next day, everyone performs her rites, and later, when the office colleagues arrive, one of them reveals that Chaaru is the sole cause of Aparna's death, because she had stolen the project, that he had to do. This angers Ramachari, and he scolds her badly, in front of his sister-in-law's dead body. She gets deeply disturbed, and tries to take her life, by falling off a hill, but is saved by her friend. Later, it is also told that, Aparna was pregnant, through a letter she had written prior to her death, which also causes deep anger in her husband. He vows to kill Chaaru, for killing his wife. Meanwhile, Chaaru is deeply angered at home. The following morning Kodanda, and Charu both go missing, and Kodanda is found to be getting his hair cut, in the backyard. When Kodanda, is about to stab Chaaru, Ramachari calls her, thereby telling that his brother has come to her room, but again Kodanda is attacked by Chaaru's mom, soon. Then, the following day Chaaru goes to the police station to save Kodanda, by blackmailing her mom, by shooting her hand, after stealing the police's gun. The next day, Ramachari vows to avenge his sister-in-law's death, thus he tells an anonymous person and executes a plan, the following day.  

He first kidnaps Manyata to an undisclosed location and disguising himself to be an enemy of her husband, tells that he'll kill her, and later when Chaaru is summoned, Ramachari comes and reveals he was the one behind this, and did to make them understand an important lesson. Days pass by, and Chaaru's love gets more and more stronger, and she finally proposes her love, but Ramachari rejects her. Despite this, she does not lose hope. She disguises herself, as Shailu, a call Centre worker, to impress him, and also saves his sister, from a local later the following day. The next day, Ramachari meets Shailu (Chaaru dressed in traditional wear), and thus gives her a saree, given by her sister. Days pass by, and Chaaru's love keeps growing, while in office. But every time, Ramachari wants to meet Shailu, Chaaru disguises herself and goes. A critical time, arrives when Shailu is asked by Ramachari's grandmother for marrying her grandson [not mentioning his name], causing further problems. Later, Ramachari, out of mere accident, pulls her into a room away, causing some chemicals to react with her eyes, during a chemical factory visit, which was scheduled to be demolished by its owner. The doctors tell that, Chaaru has lost her eyesight, and she is blind till death. After office colleagues accuse him of his mistake, he feels sad, and in return takes Chaaru to his home, until blindless was cure, while he speaks to the doctor's friend who is in US and has found a new cure for blindless. On the same day, Kodanda throws Chaaru out of his house, and she eventually falls into a well, but Ramachari saves her, and vows to take care of her, as long as she stays there, by slapping his brother inadvertently. The next day, he calls up Shailu, to talk about the incidents occurring, and she console him. Then, the next day a special doctor arrives from US to treat her, and when the bandage is removed, to Ramachari's shock, she says she cannot see anything, and the doctor tells Ramachari that she has lost her eyes permanently, Soon after that, Manyata arrives there and searches for Chaaru, but she escapes from her by help of Deepa and others. But soon she gets caught and Manyata learns that her daughter is blind and takes her home.       

Manyata also learns that her daughter has lost her eyesight permanently. Hence, to avenge her anger, goes and tries to burn Ramachari and his family alive, which is when Chaaru comes and saves them. Meanwhile, Vihaan disagrees with Chaaru to marry her as well. This deeply saddens Maanyata. On the other hand, Ramachari meets a godly man, whom we met 10 years ago, when he was young, who instructs him to go to a divine place in Chikmagalur, hence he takes Chaaru there, but the Swamiji at the ashram says that she needs to do extra-hard work to get her eyes back to which she agrees. But, despite the fact she is able to see, she lies at the end that she cannot see [because of her love towards Ramachari]. While returning back, Ramachari takes her to a hilly region, where Chaaru asks him if he will protect her throughout her life. After that, by a twist of events, Ramachari marries Charulatha on spot. On the other hand, Narayana Shastri returns back home, which makes everyone happy. But he gets deeply saddened by his daughter-in-law's death in his absence. Ramachari's strange behavior after coming back home increases suspicion in his family member's minds.                 

Jaishankar's business competitor Prakash Baneri's Vikas Baneri is decided to be the bridegroom for Chaaru. But, it is soon revealed that Prakash has evil plans (marry his son on the pretext that he would become the head of Jaishankar's company, and loot his property.). As no one is aware of this, Chaaru's family plans for the Engagement ceremony of her. But., Chaaru

Cast 
 Rithvik Krupakar as Ramachari 
 Mouna Guddemane as Charulatha
 Jhansi Kaverappa as Manyata, Jayashankar 's second wife and Charulatha's mother
 Anjali Sudhakar as Ramachari's Mother
 Shankar Ashwath as Narayana Shastri,  Ramachari Father
 Chi. Guru Dutt as Jayashankar, Charu's Father
 Mithun Tejasvi
 Sirija as Sharmila, Jayashankar's 1st Wife
 Punitha Gowda as Aparna, Ramachari's Sister-in-law
 Shree Bhavya
 Shruthi Purushottam
 MS Jahangir as Manager of a Business Company
 Sanjeev Jamadar
 Sushmitha
 Nidhi Gowda
 Akshatha
 Bharath Chakravarthy
 Suresh Rai as Ashuthosh Agarwal, a Businessman
 Srikumar
 Shwetha B as Narayana Shastri's Sister
 Monica
 Puneeth Babu as Shashikanth Deshpande, Police Inspector
 Raji Talikote as Guest Appearance
 Balaraj as Narayana Shastri's sister's Husband

Adaptations

References 

Colors Kannada original programming
Kannada-language television shows